Motherwell North is one of the twenty-one wards used to elect members of the North Lanarkshire Council. It elects four councillors and covers part of Motherwell (the Cleekhimin, Coursington and Globe neighbourhoods) plus the nearby, adjoining villages of Carfin, Newarthill and most of New Stevenston (other than streets north of the Shotts Line railway tracks), with a combined population of 18,191 in 2019; created in 2007, its boundaries remained unchanged in a 2017 national review.

Councillors

Election Results

2017 Election
2017 North Lanarkshire Council election

2012 Election
2012 North Lanarkshire Council election
 

On 8 March 2016, Labour councillors Helen McKenna and Peter Nolan resigned from the party and became Independents.

2014 by-election
Labour councillor Annita McAuley died on 23 October 2013. A by-election was held on 23 January 2014 and the seat was retained by Labour's Pat O'Rourke.

2007 Election
2007 North Lanarkshire Council election

References

Wards of North Lanarkshire
Motherwell